Vanidodes is a locality and minor local entity located in the municipality of Magaz de Cepeda, in León province, Castile and León, Spain. As of 2020, it has a population of 32.

Geography 
Vanidodes is located 65km west of León, Spain.

References

Populated places in the Province of León